Samuel Norrby (13 November 1906 – 28 November 1955) was a Swedish shot putter who won five consecutive Swedish titles in 1930–34. He competed in the 1934 European Championships and placed fourth, 9 cm behind the bronze medal. In the 1950s Norrby held leading positions in the Swedish Athletics Association and was a member of parliament.

References

Swedish male shot putters
1906 births
1955 deaths
Athletes from Stockholm